Elvie Chok was a Hong Kong international lawn and indoor bowler.

Chok won a gold medal in the 1977 World Outdoor Bowls Championship pairs, in Worthing with Helen Wong.

She died in 2015.

References

Hong Kong female bowls players
1924 births
2015 deaths
Bowls World Champions